Amte is an Indian surname. Notable people with the surname include:
Baba Amte (1914–2008), Indian social worker and activist, particularly in serving people with leprosy
Mandakini Amte, Indian doctor and social worker
Prakash Amte (born 1948), Indian social worker, husband of Mandakini and son of Baba